Lamadelaine railway station is a railway station serving Lamadelaine, in the commune of Pétange, in south-western Luxembourg.  It is operated by Chemins de Fer Luxembourgeois, the state-owned railway company.

The station is situated on Line 70, which connects the south-west of the country to Luxembourg City.

External links
 Official CFL page on Lamadelaine station
 Rail.lu page on Lamadelaine station

Railway stations in Pétange
Railway stations on CFL Line 70